Nocardicin A is a monocyclic β-lactam antibiotic included in the monobactam subclass.  It is obtained from the fermentation broth of a strain of actinomycetes Nocardia uniformis subsp. tsuyamenensis as a metabolic product catalyzed by the enzyme nocardicin-A epimerase. It is stereochemically and biologically related to penicillin and cephalosporins.

References

Monobactam antibiotics
Amino acid derivatives